Our Spoons Came from Woolworths is a novel by the English writer Barbara Comyns, first published in 1950.

The story
The book is based on Comyns's marriage to John Pemberton, which ended in 1935. In the bohemian London of the 1930s, Sophia Fairclough and her husband Charles are painters, twenty-one and newly married, and poor. Sophia has two babies and a pet newt, becomes a life model to support her family and starts an affair with an elderly art critic called Peregrine. The book is substantially autobiographical, with only a small number of purely imaginary scenes.

Publication 
Our Spoons Came from Woolworths was published by Eyre & Spottiswoode in 1950. It was reissued by Virago in 1983, and has been reprinted several times since then.

References

1950 British novels
English novels
Novels set in London
Eyre & Spottiswoode books